The  is the name of a semi-annual award presented to mangaka by the Japanese publisher Shueisha. The award has been given since 1974 and it aims to reward new manga artist in the comedy manga category. Its counterpart award, Tezuka Award, awards new manga artists in the Story Manga category. Notable entrants and winners include Takeshi Okano, Kazumata Oguri, Mitsutoshi Shimabukuro, Norihiro Yagi and Yusuke Murata. The award was named after Fujio Akatsuka, one of the most successful comedy mangaka.

See also

 List of manga awards

References

Manga awards
Comics awards
Awards established in 1974
1974 establishments in Japan
Shueisha